Barr Water is a westerly flowing river of the Kintyre peninsula in the southwest Scottish Highlands. Rising at the diminutive Loch Losgainn near the hill of Cruach Mhic-an t-Saoir, it initially flows south-southwestwards amongst conifer plantations before turning west-southwestwards to flow down Barr Glen to reach the sea at Glenbarr.

References 

Kintyre
Rivers of Argyll and Bute